"Everybody's Favorite Bagman" is the sixth episode of the police procedural and legal drama Law & Order. It originally aired on NBC on October 30, 1990. It was produced in 1988 and was the pilot episode of the series.

Plot
After local councilman and former bagman Charles Halsey is mugged and his throat slashed, Logan and Greevey investigate the case and the two young black male suspects initially caught. Their suspicion turns to organized crime when they link the victim to Masucci family soldier Tony Scalisi (Paul Guilfoyle).

As Stone and Robinette continue their investigation, they uncover a corruption scandal involving a councilman; the collection of parking meter violation fines has been awarded to a firm connected to organized crime. To avoid the appearance of impropriety, District Attorney Wentworth won't allow Stone to offer Scalisi immunity. However, in order to win their case, their only option might be to make a deal with the mobster.

Stone discovers that the case involves not only organized crime, but also elected city officials and a deputy police commissioner whom he accuses of changing his testimony and doctoring evidence in a past case. Stone is unable to use the police because of suspected corruption within the department, so he consults Assistant U.S. Attorney John McCormack (William H. Macy).

Production
"Everybody's Favorite Bagman" was directed by John Patterson and written by Dick Wolf. It was produced in 1988 and was the pilot of the series. However, NBC decided to air "Prescription for Death" as the premiere episode instead.

For this episode, Roy Thinnes was cast as District Attorney Alfred Wentworth. However, by the time the production of Law & Order began in 1990, Thinnes had already moved on to star in another series, and declined to continue the role. Steven Hill was selected as his replacement to portray District Attorney Adam Schiff.

Steven Zirnkilton, who narrates the opening sequence in every episode of each Law & Order series, makes his sole onscreen appearance in this episode. He has one line of dialogue: "Look at that. Do you believe these guys?"

Inspiration
The episode was loosely based on the 1986 Parking Violations Bureau scandal that resulted in the death (by suicide) of Queens Borough President Donald Manes.

Notes

References

Bibliography

Law & Order episodes
1990 American television episodes
Television pilots within series
Television episodes directed by John Patterson (director)